Thomas Hay (July 1858 – 10 January 1940) was an English footballer who played as a goalkeeper. He was born in Staveley, Derbyshire. He played in the Football League for Accrington and Burton Swifts, and also played for Staveley, Bolton Wanderers, Great Lever, Halliwell, Burslem and Newton Heath LYR.

References

External links
profile

1858 births
1940 deaths
People from Staveley, Derbyshire
Footballers from Derbyshire
English footballers
Association football goalkeepers
Staveley F.C. players
Bolton Wanderers F.C. players
Great Lever F.C. players
Halliwell F.C. players
Manchester United F.C. players
Accrington F.C. players
Burton Swifts F.C. players
Football Alliance players
English Football League players